Bilal Ashraf (born 10 October 1979) is a Pakistani actor, producer and visual effects director. After studying visual effects from the Franklin Marshall College, he started his career as a visual effects director and then pursued his career in acting after making a brief appearance in the 2014 thriller O21. Ashraf has since starred in the romantic comedy Janaan (2016), the acclaimed war drama Yalghaar (2017) and the musical romance Superstar (2019).

Life and career
Bilal Ashraf was born in Karachi into an Urdu speaking family of Punjabi origins. Playing a Pashtun character in Janaan (2016) but himself not being one, he learned some Pashto for his role, enough to "look comfortable lip-syncing to songs."

Ashraf received his early education from St. Michael's Convent School in Karachi. He studied visual effects direction at Franklin & Marshall College in Pennsylvania, United States. He did a double major in finance and arts. Later he went to Escape Studios in London to learn animation. He has ten years of experience behind the camera.

Ashraf initially worked as a hedge consultant in New York but he later quit his job and moved to London in order to study animation and visual effects on the insistence of his late sister, Sadia Ashraf, a director as well as a teacher of filmmaking at the New York University, who wanted to improve Pakistan's cinema and with whom he created Radical Films. She is the reason he decided to become an actor. Ashraf has named Pink Floyd as his all-time favorite band, has chosen Scent of a Woman as the movie which pushed him to become an actor while he also described sculpting and painting as his "hidden talents."

Ashraf made a cameo appearance in the 2014 thriller film O21. In 2016, Ashraf made his lead acting debut in Janaan, a romantic comedy, alongside Armeena Khan and Ali Rehman Khan, which was appreciated by critics as well by the audiences. The next year he appeared in the war film Yalghaar which had a decent opening at the box office, while his other 2017 release, Rangreza, was both a critical and commercial failure.

In 2019, he played the leading role in Ehteshamuddin's directorial debut, Superstar, produced by Momina Duraid and with Mahira Khan as co-star. Superstar becomes the highest-grossing film for Bilal Ashraf. Explaining his long absence since Rangreza, he said that, considering its missed potential, he'll look more seriously at the scripts, and also shared the fact that he took acting classes in the United Kingdom as well as theater classes with actor Sunil Shankar in the NAPA, in Karachi. 

In 2021 he launched his acting career on television with Aik Hai Nigar and also became a producer, founding the production house Behive Transmedia with director-actor Ehteshamuddin, their first release being the historical drama Khaab Toot Jaatay Hain.

Achievements and Awards 
Bilal Ashraf is a famous actor, producer and visual effects director. Here are some of his brilliant achievements for his hard work. He won his first Award in 2017 for 3rd Pakistani Music and Media as a Best Actor Award from Janaan Movie. After that in 2021 he won 5th Kashmir Hum Style Awards as a Most Stylish Actor in Film from Superstar movie. Bilal Ashraf also won the Pakistan Digital Awards for the Host for Jubilee and Best Actor award from Superstar Movie in last year 2022.

In the media
In 2019 he was featured in the magazine Eastern Eye's listing in United Kingdom and was ranked at No. 7th on "Sexiest Asian Men" which included Ali Zafar, Hrithik Roshan, Zayn Malik and Ali Rehman Khan.

Filmography

Film

Television series

Telefilm

Other appearance

Awards and nominations

References

External links
 
 
 
 

1979 births
Pakistani male television actors
Living people
Pakistani male film actors
Male actors from Karachi
Muhajir people
Punjabi people
Visual effects artists
Pakistani producers
21st-century Pakistani male actors
People from Karachi
Pakistani television producers
Hum Award winners
Male actors in Urdu cinema